Alexandra Barbara Nilsson (born 18 April 1991), also known as Kissie, is a Swedish blogger.

Kissie was born in Stockholm to a Swedish father and a Polish mother.

She started her blog in January 2007.

In June 2010, Kissie started her music career by recording "Success" which was released a month later.

Since the political 2010 election in Sweden, Kissie has expressed critical opinions regarding Sweden's left-wing political parties, and encouraged her readers not to vote for them.

In 2010, Flashback released an uncensored version of a nude photograph she had previously published on her blog. She later admitted that she had released the photograph for media attention, but claimed that she had not actually been nude when the photograph was taken, but rather had had her clothes edited out by digital image manipulation.

In 2017, the Swedish Consumer Ombudsman charged Kissie, who operates her blog under the aegis of Kissie Media AB, with implying a personal recommendation for some products when actually the product is being marketed through the operations of Kissie Media. If intended to deceive readers, this is illegal. Kissie contested this claim, holding that modern consumers are media-savvy enough to know the difference between truly personal recommendations and paid advertisements. In January 2018 the Swedish Patent and Market Court ruled that two posts by Kissie had indeed failed to provide a sufficiently clear indication that they were advertisements. 

In 2019, Kissie announced in a popular podcast that she will change her name from Nilsson to her mother's Polish maiden family name Pietruniak, because "Nilsson is a boring name, it can be anyone" and because she has realized that it is "cool to have an identity that is not only Swedish". When Kissie first disclosed her Polish background on her blog she received a lot of abusive xenophobic comments, for example telling her to "return to Poland".

References

External links

Alexandra Nilsson's channel on YouTube

1991 births
Living people
Swedish bloggers
Swedish people of Polish descent
Singers from Stockholm
21st-century Swedish women singers